The Russian White, Russian Black, and Russian Tabby are breeds of cat created in 1971, derived from the Russian Blue.

History 
In the UK, Frances McLeod of Arctic began breeding Russian Whites and Russian Blacks in the 1960s.

In Australia, The Russian White program started on the 4 May 1971 by Dick and Mavis Jones of Myemgay Cattery.  Below is an excerpt from an article by Mavis Jones.

Full register status was given by Royal Agricultural Society (RAS) Cat Club of  New South Wales in November 1975.

Breeding program

The white "Siberian cat" – which may have been of Siberian breed or simply and unpedigreed cat from Siberia – was mated to Myemgay Yuri, a blue male.  She produced two white kittens, the best was kept and named White Rose (female) and this cat was the foundation female for the Russian White.
 
White Rose was mated back to Myemgay Yuri producing two first generation White Russian kittens.  The only line of whites from this mating that we are aware of is Myemgay Arctic Girl (female) the first generation Russian White.
  
She was mated to Myemgay Little Lemon (blue) and produced Myemgay Arctic Star (female 2nd generation Russian White).  Arctic Star was mated back to Myemgay Yuri (blue) and produced Myemgay Arctic Snowflake (female 3rd generation Russian White).  Arctic Snowflake was mated to Eastern Ninotchka (blue) and produced Myemgay Arctic Kosack (male 4th generation Russian White).

At this time, no Russian Whites had left Myemgay Cattery as the RAS Cat Club only fully registered cats when they reached the 4th generation.  Up to this stage, they had been on the provisional register.

Recognition 
Today the Russian White is fully recognised in Australia, New Zealand, and South Africa and exists in various stages of recognition in the United Kingdom, many countries in mainland Europe, and the United States.

In 2010 the American Cat Fanciers Association recognised the Russian Black and Russian White for championship status. ACFA Russian Shorthair Standard

See also
 Russian Blue

References

Cat breeds
Cat breeds originating in Australia